Alida Sophia Hendriks (1901-1984) was a Dutch painter.

Biography
Hendriks was born on 3 June 1901 in The Hague. She was a member of the Pulchri Studio. Hendriks's work was included in the 1939 exhibition and sale Onze Kunst van Heden (Our Art of Today) at the Rijksmuseum in Amsterdam.

Hendriks died on 15 August 1984 in The Hague.

References

1901 births
1984 deaths
Artists from The Hague
Dutch women artists
Dutch painters